On the Couch is an Australian television program focusing on current issues in the Australian Football League. From its debut in 2002 until 2006, it was shown on the Fox Footy Channel, until the channel's demise. From 2007 to 2011 it was broadcast on Fox Sports, before moving to the relaunched Fox Footy from 2012 onwards. The show airs on Monday nights before AFL 360

Format
The shows format follows an "informal chat" style in a set that resembles a lounge room. It focuses more on in-depth coverage, analysis and discussions of topics from the weekend as well as occasionally holding an interview with a player or coach during the 2nd half of the episode.

The concept and style is similar to the Seven Network program Talking Footy, which also featured Mike Sheahan as chief journalist during its original run from 1994 to 2004.

History
Former players Gerard Healy and Robert Walls and journalist Mike Sheahan were the original presenters of the show. In 2009, James Hird replaced Walls on the couch. When Hird left to pursue a coaching career with Essendon, Paul Roos  replaced him. In 2014, Roos left to coach the Melbourne Football Club and was replaced by long-time Fox Footy broadcaster and former player Jason Dunstall.

In 2015, Mike Sheahan announced that he was retiring from the show after 13 years. His replacement was recently retired Brisbane Lions triple-premiership player Jonathan Brown. David King, who appeared occasionally in 2015, joined the series full-time in 2016. In July 2016, the original line-up of Healy, Sheahan and Walls returned for a special one-off episode before Fox Footy's 'Retro Round'.

In late 2021, Healy stepped down as host with Garry Lyon replacing him, the show also commenced airing before AFL 360.

Regular hosts and panelists
 Garry Lyon (Host, 2022–present, panelist, 2018–2021))
 Jonathan Brown (2015–present)
 Nathan Buckley (2023–present)
 Gerard Healy (Host, 2002–2021)
 Mike Sheahan (2002–2014)
 Robert Walls (2002–2008)
 James Hird (2009–2010)
 Paul Roos (2011–2013, 2018–2019)
 David King (2015–2017)
 Jason Dunstall (2014–2017)
 Nick Riewoldt (2020–2022)

Various Fox Sports commentators have filled in along the way including Jason Dunstall, Brian Taylor and Alastair Lynch.

See also

 List of Australian television series
 List of longest-running Australian television series

References

External links
On the Couch official website
 

Fox Sports (Australian TV network) original programming
Fox Footy original programming
Australian rules football television series
2002 Australian television series debuts
2010s Australian television series
English-language television shows